Body Parts is the debut studio album by Prophet Posse, a collaboration side-project of Three 6 Mafia with members of its then-label, Prophet Entertainment. The Prophet Posse group was known as a larger, "offshoot" version of Three 6 Mafia, as it included each member of Three 6 Mafia as well as all the artists signed to Prophet Entertainment. All the artists featured on the album were Prophet Entertainment artists with the exception of guest act Dayton Family. The album was released on February 24, 1998, by Prophet Entertainment and distributed through S.O.H. Distributors Network.

Track listing 

 All tracks are produced by DJ Paul and Juicy J

Charts

References 

1998 debut albums
Three 6 Mafia albums
Prophet Entertainment
Albums produced by DJ Paul
Albums produced by Juicy J